Wakasa (written: 若狭 or 輪笠) is a Japanese surname. Notable people with the surname include:

Kody Wakasa (born 1994), American soccer player
, Japanese ice hockey player
, Japanese lawyer and politician
, Japanese footballer
, Japanese ski jumper
, Japanese businessman
, Japanese footballer

Japanese-language surnames